Ramachandra Raya (1367–1422 CE) was an emperor of the Vijayanagara Empire from the Sangama Dynasty.

Ramachandra Raya was the eldest son of Deva Raya I. He became ruler of the Vijayanagara Empire after his father's death in 1422. Throughout his reign there were no recorded significant changes in territory or major events. Afterwards, he was succeeded by his brother, Vijararaya, in the same year, who (similarly to Ramachandra) was not noted for doing anything significant.

External links
 http://www.ourkarnataka.com/states/history/historyofkarnataka40.htm
 https://web.archive.org/web/20051219170139/http://www.aponline.gov.in/quick%20links/HIST-CULT/history_medieval.html

1422 deaths
15th-century Indian monarchs
People of the Vijayanagara Empire
Sangama dynasty
1367 births
Indian Hindus
Hindu monarchs